The 2020–21 Montreal Canadiens season was the 112th for the club that was established on December 4, 1909, and their 104th season as a franchise in the National Hockey League.

Due to the Canada–U.S. border restrictions brought in as a result of the COVID-19 pandemic, the Canadiens were re-aligned with the other six Canadian franchises into the newly-formed North Division. The league's 56 game season was played entirely within the new divisions, meaning that Montreal and the other Canadian teams played an all-Canadian schedule for the 2020–21 regular season as well as the first two rounds of the 2021 Stanley Cup playoffs.

On May 10, 2021, the Canadiens clinched a playoff berth after a 4–3 overtime loss to the Edmonton Oilers. In the First Round, the Canadiens successfully overcame a 3–1 series deficit to defeat the Toronto Maple Leafs in seven games. In the Second Round, the Canadiens swept the Winnipeg Jets in four games. Since they were the lowest-remaining team from the second round, they played against the Vegas Golden Knights in the Stanley Cup Semifinals, defeating them in six games. The Canadiens won the Clarence S. Campbell Bowl and advanced to the Stanley Cup Finals for the first time since 1993, subsequently ending a 10-year Canadian team Finals appearance drought, the Vancouver Canucks (in 2011) being the previous team to reach such juncture. In the 2021 Stanley Cup Finals against the Tampa Bay Lightning, the Canadiens lost the first three games of the series, finally earning a win in game four. However, the Canadiens were defeated in five games.

Standings

Divisional standings

Schedule and results

Regular season
The regular season schedule was published on December 23, 2020.

Playoffs

Player statistics

Skaters

Goaltenders

†Denotes player spent time with another team before joining the Canadiens. Stats reflect time with the Canadiens only.
‡Denotes player was traded mid-season. Stats reflect time with the Canadiens only.
Bold/italics denotes franchise record.

Awards and honours

Milestones

Transactions
The Canadiens had been involved in the following transactions during the 2020–21 season.

Trades

Notes:
The Buffalo Sabres will retain 50% of Staal's salary for the remainder of the 2020-21 season.
 The Philadelphia Flyers will retain 50% of Gustafsson's salary for the remainder of the 2020-21 season.

Contract terminations

Waivers

Free agents

Signings

Draft picks

Below are the Montreal Canadiens' selections at the 2020 NHL Entry Draft, which was held virtually via Video conference call from the NHL Network studio in Secaucus, New Jersey on October 6–7, 2020. Originally scheduled for June 26–27, 2020 at the Bell Center in Montreal, Quebec, the draft was subsequently postponed on March 25, 2020 due to the COVID-19 pandemic and moved to such format hereafter. 

Notes:
 The Chicago Blackhawks' second-round pick will go to the Montreal Canadiens as the result of a trade on June 30, 2019 that sent Andrew Shaw and a seventh-round pick in 2021 to Chicago in exchange for a seventh-round pick in 2020, a third-round pick in 2021 and this pick.
 The Winnipeg Jets' fourth-round pick will go to the Montreal Canadiens as the result of a trade on June 30, 2018 that sent Simon Bourque to Winnipeg in exchange for Steve Mason, Joel Armia, a seventh-round pick in 2019 and this pick.
 The Tampa Bay Lightning's fourth-round pick will go to the Montreal Canadiens as the result of a trade on October 7, 2020 that sent St. Louis' second-round pick in 2020 to Tampa Bay in exchange for a second-round pick in 2021 and this pick.
 The Florida Panthers' fifth-round pick will go to the Montreal Canadiens as the result of a trade on June 22, 2019 that sent Chicago's fifth-round pick in 2019 to Florida in exchange for this pick.

Notes

References

Montreal Canadiens
Canadiens
Montreal Canadiens seasons
2020s in Montreal
2020 in Quebec
Montreal